Ute Wartenberg FSA (born 1963) is a German numismatist and the first woman president and executive director of the American Numismatic Society. She obtained her DPhil in Papyrology and Classical Literature from Oxford University on a Rhodes Scholarship, and later taught there. After two decades as ANS Executive Director, she took on a research curator role, before being elected as the ANS President in 2020.

Wartenberg serves as an adjunct professor of classics at Columbia University and as the curator of the Amastris Collection, a private collection of Greek coins.

Career
Wartenberg received an undergraduate education at the University of Saarbrucken, where she studied ancient history. After graduating, she enrolled in the University of Oxford as a Rhodes scholar, completing her dissertation entitled Some papyri from Oxyrhynchus in 1990 at the Faculty of Literae Humaniores. From 1991 to 1998, Wartenberg was the Curator of Greek Coins at the British Museum in London. She then served as executive director of the American Numismatics Society for twenty years. In 2000, she oversaw a controversial budget-cutting and reorganization to reduce the society's deficit, which included a move of the Society's facilities to a new location in the Manhattan Financial District, followed by a second move to SoHo.

In 2002, Wartenberg was appointed to the Citizens Commemorative Coin Advisory Committee of the U.S. Mint, of which she was later appointed Chairperson. Wartenberg was Chairperson of the Citizens Coinage Advisory Committee from 2003 to 2007.

In 2017, Wartenberg was appointed on the Anti-Counterfeiting Task Force committee of the Anti-Counterfeiting Educational Foundation.

Since 2008, she has been a Trustee of the Augustus Saint-Gaudens Memorial in New Hampshire. She was a Trustee, President and CEO of the Annie Tinker Association for Women from 2009-18. Wartenberg has served on the Committee of the International Numismatic Council since 2015. In 2019 she was elected Chairperson of ICOM International Committee for Money and Banking Museums.

Wartenberg has been interviewed and quoted in numerous publications and news stories.

Research
Wartenberg has published widely in research journals and numismatic publications and is a well-known editor, co-editor, and contributor for major research publications in numismatics. These include White Gold: Studies in Early Electrum Coinage with ANS Chief Curator Peter van Alfen, as well as numismatic Festschriften, including Presbeus: Studies in Ancient Coinage Presented to Richard Ashton with  Andrew Meadows and ΚΑΙΡΟΣ: Contributions to Numismatics in Honor of Basil Demetriadi.

Honors
Wartenberg was elected as Numismatic Ambassador in 2002. She was made a Fellow of the Society of Antiquaries of London in 2008. She was awarded the honorary award of the Gesellschaft für Internationale Geldgeschichte in Germany in 2015. In 2017 she was a Visiting Professor of the City of Wrocław, Poland.

Personal life
She is married to Jonathan Kagan, who also studied classics at Oxford.

References

Women numismatists
German Rhodes Scholars
Alumni of the University of Oxford
People from Saarbrücken
1963 births
Living people